St. Catharines—Brock was a provincial electoral division in Ontario, Canada containing the town of Niagara-on-the-Lake as well as the southern portion of the city of St. Catharines. It was created prior to the 1975 provincial election, and was abolished in 1999 when Ontario adjusted all of its provincial electoral divisions to match those at the federal level. With the riding being merged into the ridings of St. Catharines, Niagara Falls, and Niagara Centre.

Members of Provincial Parliament

Provincial election results

|}

|}

|}

|}

|}

|}

|}

Former provincial electoral districts of Ontario
Niagara-on-the-Lake
Politics of St. Catharines